Herrera de Pisuerga is a municipality located in the province of Palencia, Castile and León, Spain. It takes its name from the River Pisuerga.

According to the 2004 census (INE), the municipality had a population of 2,457 inhabitants.

References

Municipalities in the Province of Palencia